Meelis Aasmäe (born 13 June 1972 in Palupera, Elva Parish) is an Estonian professional cross-country skier based in Sultsi, Estonia. Aasmäe has to date competed in two Winter Olympic Games in 1998 and 2002 but has failed to achieve a medal in either games. He has also competed on the World Cup circuit for several years but is yet to achieve a podium placing.

Footnotes

External links

1972 births
Living people
People from Elva Parish
Estonian male cross-country skiers
Olympic cross-country skiers of Estonia
Cross-country skiers at the 1998 Winter Olympics
Cross-country skiers at the 2002 Winter Olympics